The Ahwahnechee are a Native American people who traditionally lived in the Yosemite Valley and still live in surrounding area. They are the seven tribes of Yosemite Miwok, Northern Paiute, Kucadikadi Mono Lake people. As one of the most documented tribes the tribe still fights for Federal Recognition. The Ahwahnechee people's heritage can be found all over Yosemite National Park.

History
The Ahwahnechee lived in Yosemite Valley for centuries. It is believed that they may have lived in the area for as long as 7,000 years. According to NPS historians, they were primarily Southern Miwok, with related Miwok tribes living North and South and West. They routinely traded with both Paiute and Mono tribes across the mountains to the east, and intermarried with those people.

Initial contacts 
European-American contact began after 1833. In 1850 a settler named James D. Savage set up a mining camp down below the valley, and spent most of his time mining for gold and trading with the few other white men in the area. He took several Indian wives and developed influential relations with the nearby natives. Later that year, Savage's camp and post were attacked by the Ahwahnechee. Savage had moved into the Ahwahnechee land and effectively disrupted the lives of every Ahwahnechee. The Ahwahnechee raided his supplies, and killed two of his men. This, in turn, sparked the Mariposa Indian War of 1850 to 1851. In 1851, during the Mariposa War, California State Militia troops of the Mariposa Battalion burned Ahwahnechee villages and took their food stores. 

The state militia with Savage as their major and the Indian Commissioners from Washington were called out to either convince or force the natives to sign treaties. Six tribes made agreements with the government to accept reservation land further down into the foothills. One of the tribes that refused to meet was the Ahwahnechees. When the soldiers, led by Savage, moved towards their camp to force them out, their chief, Teneiya, finally appeared alone and attempted to conceal the location and number of his people. Major Savage told Teneiya that he would travel to the valley to find his people. Chief Teneiya said that he would go back and return with his tribe. When the chief appeared again Savage noticed that there were very few of the natives present. He asked the chief where the rest of his people were, and Teneiya denied having any more people than were there at the moment. Savage was convinced that if he found the rest of the tribe he could persuade them to come with him back to the negotiations. The Major took some men with him to the north through the mountains and came upon the valley. This was the first entry into Yosemite Valley by any white men. Camping that night the men debated what to call the valley they had just discovered. They agreed upon the name that the white men had already called the tribe, Yosemite.  The date was March 25, 1851.
Once they reached the village of Teneiya's people a search was made but no more Indians were found there or in the valley at all. The soldiers returned to the meeting place but Chief Teneiya and the part of the tribe that was already in their custody escaped and returned to the mountains.

That May, a second expedition of militia travelled north to capture the old chief and his band once and for all. Only a few braves, among them two of Chief Teneiya's sons, were found. The chief was eventually brought in to find that his sons had been shot for trying to escape. Within a few days the chief also tried to escape by jumping into the river.

With the recapture of Chief Teneiya the rest of the band was easily found and brought to the Fresno reservation in the foothills where they stayed long enough to regain their strength and petitioned for their freedom to return to their mountain home. This was granted and they returned to their secluded valley of “Ahwahnee.”

In 1852, a Mariposa expedition of US federal troops heard a report that Ahwahnechee Indians killed two European-American miners at Bridalveil Meadows. Soldiers were again dispatched and the troops executed five Ahwahnechee men. Later, the tribe fled over the mountains to shelter with a neighboring people, the Mono tribe. They stayed the year and then returned to their native valley taking with them horses stolen from the hospitable Monos who soon followed seeking revenge, killing Chief Teneiya and all but eight of the young braves and taking all the women and children captive.

Later history  

Chief Teneiya (d. 1853) was a leader in Yosemite Valley. His father was Ahwahnechee. He led his band away from Yosemite to settle with Paiutes in eastern California. Tenaya has descendants living today.

The US federal government has evicted Yosemite Native people from the park in 1851, 1906, 1929, and 1969.

Jay Johnson, an alleged Ahwahnechee leader in the Mariposa Indian Council, hopes to get federal recognition for Miwok Indians.

Plant use
The Ahwahneechee burned undergrowth in the Valley to protect the oak trees. Acorns were a central staple of their diet, Black oak acorns providing almost 60% of it. The acorns were lain on a slab of rock in the sun to dry. Then they were ground up in small holes atop big granite slabs also called a mortar and pestal.  Once they had been sufficiently ground down to a fine powder, the acorn “flour” was put into a shallow depression at the edge of the river. This depression was lined, often with nearby ferns, to keep the acorn powder from being lost in the sand. Rocks were then heated in a fire and placed into the small depression with the acorn flour to heat and potentially boil the bitter taste out, to make it more palatable. When soaked and edible, the flour, now turned to a mush due to the water, was taken out and put into willow cooking baskets. It was heated over a fire, and consumed either as a mush, or baked into a flat bread.

National Park Service naturalist, Will Neely created a list of the plants commonly used by the Ahwahnechee. Black oak, sugar pine, western juniper, canyon live oak, interior live oak, foothill pine, buckeye, pinyon pine nuts provided acorns and seeds for food. Other plants provided smaller seeds. Mariposa tulip, golden brodiaea, common camas, squaw root, and Bolander's yampah provided edible bulbs and roots. Greens eaten by the Ahwahnechee included broad-leaved lupine, common monkey flower, nude buckwheat, California thistle, miner's lettuce, sorrel, clover, umbrella plant, crimson columbine, and alum root. Strawberry, blackberry, raspberry, thimbleberry, wild grape, gooseberry, currant, blue elderberry, western choke cherry, Sierra plum, and greenleaf manzanita provided berries and fruits.

The Ahwahnechee brewed drinks from whiteleaf manzanita and western juniper. Commonly used medicine plants included Yerba santa, yarrow, giant hyssop, Brewer's angelica, sagebrush, showy milkweed, mountain dogbane, balsamroot, California barberry, fleabane, mint, knotweed, wild rose, meadow goldenrod, mule ears, pearly everlasting, and the California laurel.

The tribe used soap plant and meadow rue to make soap. They used fibers from Mountain dogbane, showy milkweed, wild grape, and soap plant for cordage.

Baskets were woven from splints of American dogwood, big-leaf maple, buckbrush, deer brush, willow, and California hazelnut Additional bracken fern would add black colors to the basket and redbud would provide red.

The tribe made bows from incense-cedar, and Pacific dogwood. They built homes from Incense-cedar.

Dwellings
The people lived in camps at the bottom of the valley, in huts known as o-chum. These small homes were built with pine for the framing and supports, using the wood in a teepee like structure with a diameter of about twelve feet. For the insulation of the homes, cedar bark was used to cover the pine poles to create a sturdy and durable covering for the family housed inside. There were two openings in the huts: One was big enough to be used as an entrance, and the latter is a small opening at the top of the teepee to allow some ventilation for smoke. 

A small fire was built in the colder months for warmth. These o-chums were able to provide housing to a family of six. To make the bedding, the natives would often use the skins of small animals. The mattress was made from the skins of larger animals such as bear and deer. The blanket was - like the bedding - made from the skins of the smaller animals, cut into strips and woven together for extra warmth.  

Another sort of building that the Ahwahnechees often used was a sweat house. These structures were somewhat similar to the o-chum except for the fact that the top, instead of being at a point, was rounded and the entire structure was covered with mud. The sweat houses were used by the young hunters, before they went on a trip, to rid their bodies of the human smell that could betray their presence to the prey. And provided the men with a way to relax and cleans themselves for religious and health purposes.

Hunting
The natives had a wide range of quarry. They hunted everything from deer and large game, to worms and small insects. Apart from eating the flesh of the animals, their skins were used for clothing, sinews for tying and other purposes. Any leftover meat was hung to dry and made into jerky for later consumption. The braves went on hunting trips that could take days or even weeks, trying to get enough to take back to the tribe without diminishing the future game supply.

Paiute Ahwahnechee place names
Some Ahwahnechee tribal names for areas around Yosemite Valley include the following:

 Ahwahne: Yosemite Valley
 Tesa'ak (Teh-sa-ahk'): Half Dome (South Dome) - name of a Mono woman for whom Half Dome was named. Half Dome resembled a Mono woman's head and shoulder because they traditionally bobbed their hair and had bangs. The dark vertical dripping stripes of lichens resembled tear stains, and her tears were said to form Mirror Lake.
 Loya: Sentinel Rock
 Tutocanula or Tool-tock Awn-oo-lah: El Capitan
 Ahwayee: Mirror Lake
 Patillima or Ernating Lawootoo: Glacier Point
 Pohono: Bridalveil Fall
 Piwyack: Tenaya Lake
 Yonapah: Vernal Fall
 Yowihe: Nevada Fall
 Chookoneh: Royal Arches (Yosemite)
 Tokoyee: North Dome
 Wakalmata: Merced River
 Tahachee: Indian Canyon
 Yayan: Cascade Falls
 Yawachkee: Yosemite Museum - name of village where museum is currently located
 Mahtah: Liberty Cap

Namesakes 
The Ahwahnee Hotel and Ahwahneechee Village, a recreated 19th-century tribal village in Yosemite Valley, are both named for the tribe, as are the Ahwahnee Heritage Days. Ahwahnee, California and Ahwahnee Estates, California are also named after the tribe.

Notes

References
 Mazel, David. American Literary Environmentalism. Athens: University of Georgia Press, 2000. .

Native American tribes in California
History of the Sierra Nevada (United States)
Yosemite National Park
Mono tribe
Paiute
History of Mariposa County, California